Mansfield Engineered Components is a Mansfield, Ohio-based company that designs and manufactures closure mechanisms, counterbalances and hinges for the major appliance market.

History 
Mansfield Plating Company was founded by Otis Cummins Jr. in 1939. It provided metal finishing services for the automotive, appliance and furniture markets. In the 1960s, Cummins and his son Otis “Koke” Cummins III formed Mansfield Manufacturing, fabricating metal components for the company’s existing markets. The two companies merged to become Mansfield Industries in 1972. Another company, Mansfield Assemblies, was founded in 1987 to provide contract manufacturing and assembly operations. Mansfield Assemblies added a design and engineering group in 1989. 
On October 13, 2011, Mansfield Industries and Mansfield Assemblies announced a new name, Mansfield Engineered Components.

The company is owned and operated by Bruce, Steve and Claudia Cummins, the third generation of the Cummins family to manage the business. It employs 250 and operates from a 180,000-square-foot facility. Mansfield Engineered Components has received awards and recognition from some of its major customers for its ability to design and deliver custom closure mechanisms.
The company was also named a 2010 United States Department of Energy Save Energy Now Energy Champion Plant.

Current customers 

 Bakers Pride
 BSH Bosch
 Electrolux 
 General Electric Appliances 
 Mabe  
 The Manitowoc Company  
 Panasonic
 Sub-Zero  
 Viking Range
 Whirlpool Corporation

References

Manufacturing companies based in Ohio
Mansfield, Ohio
Manufacturing companies established in 1939
1939 establishments in Ohio